ESDS International was a Jisc/ESRC funded service which provided the UK academic community with free online access to the major databanks produced by international governmental organisations such as the World Bank, International Monetary Fund and the United Nations.  The service also supported the use of these databanks in teaching and research through the provision of a helpdesk for user queries, comprehensive documentation and training.

ESDS International also provided access to a range of international survey datasets including the European Social Survey and Eurobarometer.

The service aimed to promote and facilitate increased and more effective use of international datasets in research, learning and teaching across a range of disciplines.

Databases hosted by ESDS International included the major statistical publications of:

International Monetary Fund
World Bank
International Energy Agency
OECD
United Nations
Eurostat
International Labour Organization
UK Office for National Statistics

In July 2012, the Economic and Social Research Council (ESRC) announced that all of ESDS would become part of the UK Data Service, which was established as of October 1, 2012 - see http://www.esrc.ac.uk/research/our-research/uk-data-service/.

References

External links
UK Data Service
UKDS.Stat - access international data at the UK Data Service
UK Data Service - international data on Twitter
ESDS
MIMAS website - In July 2014, Mimas became a part of Jisc and specifically, part of the digital resources division.

Jisc
Online databases